Edwin King Stodola (October 31, 1914 – April 6, 1992) was an American radio engineer.

He was born in Brooklyn, New York, and graduated from Cooper Union with a Bachelor of Electrical Engineering in 1936 (EE '36) and a Professional Degree in Engineering in 1947 (PDE '47). In 1936, he worked with Radio Engineering Laboratories, then he joined the U.S. Signal Corps in 1939 as a civilian radio engineer. Starting in 1941, and continuing through World War II, he worked at the Evans Signal Laboratory near Belmar, New Jersey. During this period he was responsible for developing radar to thwart Kamikaze strikes by eliminating the radar "blind spot" produced by flying close to the horizon.

Following the War, Stodola was a member of Project Diana, a Signal Corps project to investigate long range radar. Led by John H. DeWitt, Jr., this group consisted of a five-man team with Stodola as the chief scientist. During a test on January 10, 1946, this team became the first to bounce a radio signal off the Moon and detect the resulting echo (Earth-Moon-Earth or EME).

He left the Signal Corps in 1947 and became an engineer with Reeves Instrument Corporation. Stodola received the Presidential Citation from Cooper Union in 1987 in recognition of his contributions to radar and radar tracking systems, and the Radio Club of America's prestigious Armstrong Medal in 1991. A licensed radio amateur (W2AXO) since childhood, he was inducted posthumously into the CQ Amateur Radio Hall of Fame in 2011. In 2017 a posthumously-awarded plaque was mounted on the InfoAge Science History Learning Center “Wall of Honor” citing his contributions to Project Diana and the development of long-range radar.

He was married to Elsa D. Stodola in 1939. The couple had a son, Robert King, and three daughters, Cynthia, Leslie, and Sherry. Following Elsa’s death in 1965, he married Rose B. Stodola in 1968.  In 1983 he moved to Central Florida.

References

Further reading
 
 
 
 

1914 births
1992 deaths
American electrical engineers
Cooper Union alumni